Trithetrum is a genus of dragonflies in the family Libellulidae. It contains only two species:
Trithetrum congoense 
Trithetrum navasi  - Navas' Darter

References

Libellulidae
Anisoptera genera